Lycaena hyllus, the bronze copper, is a butterfly of the lycaenids family found in North America.

Description
The upperside has a brown background with golden zig-zag borders along the margins of the hindwings. Females have lighter areas in the forewings with several dark spots within the lighter areas. The undersides are primarily white with dark spots and underlying orange areas. The wingspan is 23 to 38 mm.

Range
It is widespread from Alberta to northern Nevada in the west through to the east coasts of Canada and the United States. This butterfly's range is similar to that of the Lycaena heteronea, especially in Alberta. It is listed as a species of special concern in the US state of Connecticut.

Host plants
Their hosts are plants of the family Polygonaceae, especially Water dock and curled dock.

Adult plants
Adults have been observed feeding from blackberry and red clover.

References

External links

 Lycaena at Markku Savela's website on Lepidoptera

hyllus
Butterflies of North America
Taxa named by Pieter Cramer
Butterflies described in 1775